The Gallaudet DB-1B was a United States daytime bomber designed during World War I. It was the successor to the Gallaudet DB-1, a very heavy aircraft with flight control issues and serious structural problems with the wings, which never got past the ground test phase. The DB-1B was lighter than the DB-1, having redesigned, stronger wings. The DB-1B, unlike its predecessor, did manage to complete several test flights. However, the project was scrapped when flight performance was poor.

References

1910s United States bomber aircraft
DB-1B